The 1953 Tennessee A&I Tigers football team was an American football team that represented Tennessee Agricultural & Industrial State College as a member of the Midwest Athletic Association (MAA) during the 1953 college football season. In their third season under head coach Henry Kean, the Tigers compiled an 8–0–1 record, won the MAA championship, and outscored all opponents by a total of 225 to 60.

The team was selected based on the Dickinson System as the 1953 black college national champion with a Dickinson rating of 25.83, placing ahead of Prairie View (25.00), Florida A&M (24.50), and Lincoln (MO) (24.25).

Schedule

References

Tennessee A&I
Tennessee State Tigers football seasons
Black college football national champions
College football undefeated seasons
Tennessee A&I Tigers